Last Rampage is a 2017 American crime drama film directed by Dwight Little. The screenplay by Alvaro Rodriguez and Jason Rosenblatt is based on the non-fiction book Last Rampage: The Escape of Gary Tison by University of Arizona Political Science Professor James W. Clarke, and details the true story of Tison's 1978 prison escape and subsequent murders. The film stars Robert Patrick (who also produced the film) as Tison, Heather Graham as his wife Dorothy, and Chris Browning as his accomplice Randy Greenawalt. Bruce Davison plays a fictional law enforcement official pursuing Tison (a composite of several real-world individuals), and Alex MacNicoll, Skyy Moore, and Casey Thomas Brown portray Tison's three sons.

The events were previously depicted in A Killer in the Family, starring Robert Mitchum as Gary Tison, with James Spader, Eric Stoltz and Lance Kerwin as his sons.

Synopsis
The film tells the true story of the infamous prison break of Gary Tison and Randy Greenawalt from the Arizona State prison in Florence, AZ in the summer of 1978.

Cast

 Robert Patrick as Gary Tison
 Heather Graham as Dorothy Tison
 Bruce Davison as Cooper
 Alex MacNicoll as Donald "Donnie" Tison
 Molly C. Quinn as Marissa Fuller
 Skyy Moore as Ricky Tison
 Casey Thomas Brown as Raymond "Ray" Tison
 Chris Browning as Randy Greenawalt
 Jason Richter as Officer Ketchum
 William Shockley as Joe Tison
 John Heard as Blackwell
 Megan Gallagher as Mrs. Cooper
 Tamara Clatterbuck as Carolyn Simmons
 Deb Carson as Mary Jo West
 Garrett Hines as John Lyons
 Michele Martin as Donna Lyons
 Brigitte Hagerman as Margene Judge
 Kevin Joy as James Judge
 Alex Lombard as Judy Tison
 Michael Monks as Eddy
 Ren Montoro as Terry Jo Tison
 Chris Muto as Tim Darby

Reception
L.A. Times reviewer Michael Rechtshaffen called Robert Patrick "brutally effective" in a positive review of the film.

See also
 A Killer in the Family, a 1983 film about Gary Tison

References

External links
 
 

2017 films
2017 biographical drama films
American biographical drama films
Films set in Arizona
Films set in 1978
Films based on books
Films directed by Dwight H. Little
Biographical films about criminals
Drama films based on actual events
2017 drama films
2010s English-language films
2010s American films